The World Cup of Pool is an annual international single-elimination tournament for doubles teams in nine-ball pool competition. The event has been dominated by the Philippines and China, with both nations winning the event on three occasions.

History
The tournament is held annually, at various locations, and was first held in 2006 in Newport, Wales. The tournament is hosted by Matchroom Pool.

Format
There are usually 32 participating teams, representing 31 nations (the host nation is represented by two teams, A and B) composed of two players each. The participating nations do not have to go through a qualifying tournament in order to join, as they are selected by the organizers. Sixteen teams are seeded; they will face the unseeded teams at the first round.

The rules used are World Pool-Billiard Association (WPA) World Standardized Rules for nine-ball, modified for scotch doubles play (players on a team alternate shots; no one shoots twice in a row, unless being asked to play again after pushing out).

Results

Statistics

Performances by nation

^ = Results include England from 2006 to 2018

References

External links
 World Cup of Pool – Official site
 WPA Pool Calendar 
 AzBilliards.com

 
Pool competitions
pool
Recurring sporting events established in 2006
Annual sporting events